Un amore perfetto is a 2002 Italian romantic comedy film  directed by Valerio Andrei.  It stars Cesare Cremonini, who at the time of the film's release was the lead singer of the popular Italian music group Lùnapop; Martina Stella, then an emerging star following her debut performance in the 2001 film L'ultimo bacio; and Denis Fasolo.

Plot
Ceghe (Cremonini) and Berni (Fasolo) are close friends who are both uneasily transitioning into their adult lives.  They meet Laura (Stella) one evening at a nightclub, and the three rapidly become a close group who share "a perfect love."  However, romantic impulses between Laura and each of the two men eventually threaten to tear the old friends apart.

As this scenario unfolds, Ceghe becomes aware of a lucrative opportunity to sell a valuable item possessed by guests of the hotel run by his parents.  The circumstances and risks of the opportunity are unclear, but Ceghe becomes increasingly determined to make a fortune by stealing and selling the item.

Cast
 Martina Stella as Laura 
 Cesare Cremonini as Cè 
  as Berni 
  as Vicinona 
  as Betty 
Rest of cast listed alphabetically: 
  as Nanna
 Piergiorgio Fasolo 	 
 Mascia Foschi 	 
 Evelina Manna 	 
 Mauro Mercatali 	 
 Elisabetta Rocchetti
 Luca Viale

Reception
Reviewers generally described the plot of Un amore perfetto as lightweight fare.  They considered the film primarily a marketing vehicle, created to capitalize on the popularity of Cremonini and Stella.

References

External links

Un amore perfetto at Yahoo! Movies

2002 films
2002 romantic comedy-drama films
2000s Italian-language films
Films set in Italy
Italian romantic comedy-drama films
2000s Italian films